Saint Guy of Anderlecht (also, Guido, Guidon, Wye of Láken) (ca. 950–1012) was a Catholic saint from before the Great Schism of 1054. He is therefore venerated as a saint in the Orthodox Church. He was known as the Poor Man of Anderlecht.

Life and legend

Born to poor parents, he lived a simple agricultural life until at the age of fourteen, he became assistant sacristan at the Sanctuary of Our Lady at Laken, where his duties included sweeping the church, dressing the altars, taking care of the vestments and altar linens, ringing the bell for mass and vespers, and providing flowers and other decorations which were used in that church.

He shared his meager wages with the poor, and went to Brussels, having been persuaded by a merchant that he could earn more to give to the poor. Eventually he became involved in a trading venture. When the ship carrying the cargo in which he had invested sank in the harbour, Guy believed he was being punished for being greedy and went on a pilgrimage, first to Rome as penance, and then to Jerusalem where he spent seven years visiting the holy places. On his return, he met in Rome, Wondulf, dean of the church of Anderlecht, and although not in robust health himself, agreed to guide the dean and his party on their pilgrimage to the Holy Land. 

He died on his return home.

Veneration
Saint Guy is the patron saint of Anderlecht, animals with horns, bachelors, people with epilepsy, laborers, protection of outbuildings, protection of sheds, protection of stables, sacristans, sextons, work horses; and is invoked against epilepsy, against rabies, against infantile convulsions, and against mad dogs. In iconography, he is represented as a peasant praying with an angel plowing a nearby field or as a pilgrim with a book or with a hat, staff, rosary, and an ox at his feet.

Saint Guy's grave was said to have been found when a horse kicked it. Cabdrivers of Brabant led an annual pilgrimage to Anderlecht until the beginning of World War I in 1914. They and their horses headed the procession followed by farmers, grooms, and stable boys, all leading their animals to be blessed. The village fair that ended the religious procession was celebrated by various games, music, and feasting, followed by a competition to ride the carthorses bareback. The winner entered the church on bareback to receive a hat made of roses from the parish pastor.

The Collegiate Church of St. Peter and St. Guido in Anderlecht, which contains the grave in its crypt, is dedicated in his honour.

References

External links
Saint Guy of Anderlecht
 San Guido di Anderlecht

Belgian Roman Catholic saints
950s births
1012 deaths
11th-century Christian saints
People from Anderlecht